Adolf Kurrein (January 28, 1846 – October 23, 1919) was a Czech-Austrian rabbi, Zionistic activist.

Early life 
Kurrein lost his father when he was two and grew up with his sister Katharina and his mother, a seamstress. When he was fifteen he moved to Brno where he graduated in 1866. He then went to Vienna where he received his doctor's degree from the University of Vienna.

Career
He was rabbi of St. Pölten (in 1872), of Linz (from 1876 to 1882), of Bielsko-Biała (from 1882 to 1888), and in the last-named year was called in the same capacity to Teplice.

Kurrein edited the monthly "Jüdische Chronik" from 1894 to 1896 with S. Stern and I. Ziegler, and from 1897 to 1902 alone. During the last 4 years this periodical has advocated Zionism.

He was a contributor of the Jewish Encyclopedia.

Writing 
Kurrein is a disciple of Adolf Jellinek. Besides several collections of sermons, entitled respectively "Maggid Mereshit" (1880); "Maggid le-Adam" (1882); "Patriarchenbilder: I., Abraham" (1893), he is the author of the following pamphlets:
 "Die Frau im Jüdischen Volke" (1885; 2d ed., Bilin, 1901)
 "Traum und Wahrheit", a biography of Joseph (1887)
 "Arbeit und Arbeiter" (1890)
 "Die Sociale Frage im Judentume" (1890)
 "Die Pflichten des Besitzes" (1892)
 "Der Friede" (1892)
 "Das Kaddisch" (1896)
 "Der Grabstein" (1897)
 "Judäa und Rom" (1898)
 "Bibel, Heidentum, und Heidenbekehrung" (1899; 2d. ed., 1901)
 "Brauchen die Juden Christenblut?" (1900)
 "Lichtstrahlen aus den Reden Jellinek's", prepared by him for Jellinek's 70th birthday

Family 
He married Jessie Loewe in 1877, the daughter of Louis Loewe. Two of their five children were murdered in the concentration camp Auschwitz. His son Viktor Kurrein (1881-1974) was also a rabbi in Linz until he fled to England in 1938.

External links
 Dr. Peter Kraft: Geschichte der Juden in Oberösterreich ('Presentation of the history of Jews in Upper Austria')
 Kurrein Jewish Encyclopedia entry (published 1901-1906, in the Public Domain)
 Jüdische Chronik, (B180), a digitized periodical published by Kurrein, at the Leo Baeck Institute, New York

References
 

1846 births
1919 deaths
Austro-Hungarian rabbis
Czech rabbis
Zionist activists
People from Třebíč